Metrioptera saussuriana is a species belonging to the family Tettigoniidae  subfamily Tettigoniinae.It is a  high meadow species found on many mountains and low mountain ranges in southern Europe. Its range extends in the Iberian Peninsula from Portugal and Spain over the Pyrenees, southern France to the French and Swiss Jura and the southern and western Alps. Isolated populations are to be found in the Balearic Islands, in Corsica, Sardinia, some northwestern French islands and in central Europe near Salzburg . The species is missing in Germany.

References

Orthoptera of Europe
Insects described in 1872
Tettigoniinae